Antonello Riccio (active 1576) was an Italian painter of the Renaissance period.

He was the son of the painter Mariano Riccio whose style he imitated.

References

16th-century Italian painters
Italian male painters
Italian Renaissance painters
Painters from Sicily
Year of death unknown
Year of birth unknown